The singles competition of the 2001 Open SEAT Godó tennis tournament was held in April 2001. Marat Safin was the defending champion but did not compete that year.

Juan Carlos Ferrero won in the final 4–6, 7–5, 6–3, 3–6, 7–5 against Carlos Moyá.

Seeds
A champion seed is indicated in bold text and the round in which that seed was eliminated is indicated in italic text. The top eight seeds received a bye to the second round.

 n/a
  Magnus Norman (second round)
  Juan Carlos Ferrero (champion)
  Àlex Corretja (quarterfinals)
  Arnaud Clément (third round)
  Dominik Hrbatý (second round)
  Thomas Enqvist (semifinals)
  Sébastien Grosjean (second round)
  Franco Squillari (first round)
  Cédric Pioline (first round)
  Carlos Moyá (final)
  Gastón Gaudio (first round)
  Vladimir Voltchkov (first round)
  Nicolas Escudé (second round)
  Francisco Clavet (first round)
  Albert Costa (third round)

Draw

Finals

Top half

Section 1

Section 2

Bottom half

Section 3

Section 4

References

 2001 Open SEAT Godó Draw

2001 Torneo Godó
Singles